Maseru Central is a constituency and community council in the Maseru Municipality located in the Maseru District of Lesotho. The population in 2006 was 37,529.

Villages
The community of Maseru Central includes the villages of Katlehong, Lower Thetsane, Thetsane West and White City.

Others include: 
Bashanyaneng (Ha Tsolo), Florida, Ha Hoohlo, Ha Lesia, Ha Letlatsa (Qoaling),Qoatsaneng, Ha Ratjomose, Ha Thetsane, Ha Tikoe, Ha Tsolo, Hills View, LDF, Lekhalong (Ha Thetsane), Libataolong (Ha Tsolo), Mankoaneng (Ha Thetsane), Maseru Central, Maseru West, Matamong (Ha Thetsane), Matsoatlareng, New Europa, Old Europa, Race Course, Seqhobong (Ha Thetsane), Thaba-Tseka (Ha Tsolo), Lithabaneng, Ha Abia, Ha Leqele, Ha Matala, Upper Thamae, Lower Thamae.

References

External links
 Google map of community villages

Populated places in Maseru District